Zoo Hypothesis is the title of a studio album by Chicago band Tub Ring, released in 2004. The song "Alexander in Charge" contains a sample from the movie Taxi Driver.

Track listing
"Tiny, Little" (1:39)
"Death of the Robot" (1:30)
"The Promise Keeper" (4:43)
"Sharpening the Sticks" (1:50)
"I Could Never Fall in Love with You" (1:49)
"One With my Surroundings" (2:03)
"Habitat" (3:29)
"The Night Watch" (1:02)
"Dog Doesn't Bite" (3:22)
"Alexander in Charge" (2:27)
"Raindrops" (3:03)
"The Viking Song" (1:01)
"We are the Righteous" (1:55)
"Return to Me" (2:40)
"Wealth of Information" (2:38)
"Vehicle" (3:23)

All songs written by Tub Ring, except "The Night Watch" written by Roughly Enforcing Nostalgia & Tub Ring

Personnel

Kevin Gibson – Vocals
Rob Kleiner – Keyboards
Jason Fields – Bass
Dave Tavares – Drums
Shawn Sprinkel – Guitar

Additional Musicians:
James Cole – Drums (track 4)
Matthew Phelan – Violins & Turntables
Dave Winer – Trumpet
Dave Smith – Bariton Sax
Sara Sleeper – Additional Lead Vocals on tracks 5 & 16
Dave Byron – Additional Lead Guitar
Theresa Brooks – Bassoon & Background Vocals
Kathy Brooks – Background Vocals
Dan Jeremy Brooks – Sampling, Programming & Background Vocals
Swan – Additional Guitar and Background Vocals

Misc:
Tanner Woodford – CD Layout
Joan Varitek – Cover Illustrations

References

Tub Ring albums
2004 albums